Ezequiel Rodríguez may refer to:

 Ezequiel Rodríguez (actor), Argentine actor
 Ezequiel Rodríguez (footballer, born 1980), forward for Universitario de Sucre
 Ezequiel Rodríguez (footballer, born 1990), midfielder for Club Atlético Tigre
 Ezequiel Rodríguez (footballer, born 1996), forward for Rosario Central